Lawrence Kao is an American actor, best known for his roles as Tommy Wah in the Netflix series Wu Assassins, Donnie Lu in the Fox series Sleepy Hollow, Van in the CW series The Originals and Tim in the AMC series, The Walking Dead.

Early life
Kao was born and raised in Hacienda Heights, California, where he later graduated from Glen A. Wilson High School. He played Lysander in his high school's production of A Midsummer Night's Dream. However, during one of the in-class previews of the show, Kao was falsely arrested for attempted murder and assault with a deadly weapon. If convicted, the minimum sentencing would have been 40 years behind bars. Kao was later released in the absence and lack of probable cause, giving him enough time to make it before the closing night of the show. After being forced to contemplate his life inside jail, Kao realized he wanted to pursue acting as a profession.

Kao received his B.A. in theater from the University of California, Irvine (UCI), where he was a part of Kaba Modern dance team. Within the dancing community on campus, he befriended the Kinjaz dance team cofounders Mike Song and Anthony Lee.

Career

Acting 
He pursued a full-time career as an actor. Starting out, he found that including his dancing credentials on his resume would always elicit a dance request at auditions, so he removed it after several incidents.

In 2012, Kao made his television acting debut in the AMC post-apocalyptic horror series The Walking Dead. Following on from his first role, Kao won other roles on a variety of TV shows and films including Hawaii Five-0, Sleepy Hollow, Girlboss, Lucky Fifty, Silver Lake, NCIS: Los Angeles and The Purge.

On October 17, 2018, it was announced that Kao had been cast in the series regular role of Tommy Wah on the Netflix crime drama series Wu Assassins. Kao reprised his role in the sequel film Fistful of Vengeance. It was released on February 17, 2022.

Dance 
After graduating from UCI, Kao continued working as a dancer, and later competed in the first season of MTV's America's Best Dance Crew with his college dance team, Kaba Modern. 

As of June 2019, Kao is dancing with the Kinjaz dance team.

Filmography

Film

Television

References

External links
 
Interview for Google Talks

Living people
Dancers from California
Male actors from California
American breakdancers
American hip hop dancers
American male television actors
American male film actors
21st-century American male actors
Year of birth missing (living people)
American male actors of Chinese descent